The Magic of Belle Isle (released in the United Kingdom as Once More) is a 2012 drama film directed by Rob Reiner and written by Guy Thomas. The film stars Morgan Freeman, Virginia Madsen, Emma Fuhrmann, Madeline Carroll, Kenan Thompson, Nicolette Pierini, Kevin Pollak and Fred Willard. The film was released on July 6, 2012, by Magnolia Pictures.

Plot
Grumpy Monte Wildhorn is brought to spend the summer at a lakeside cabin in Belle Isle by his nephew Henry, who's friends with the owner. He is a famous Western novelist. His struggle to cope with the loss of his wife to cancer six years earlier has sapped his passion for writing and has driven him to drink heavily. 

Monte eventually befriends the family next door, attractive single mother Charlotte O'Neil and her three young daughters, teen Willow, middle child Finn and Flor. The eldest is constantly on her cell, Finn is mischievous and Flor is naïve. 

Shortly after arriving, a resident drops dead. Another neighbor asks Monte to read the pre-pared eulogy. Afterwards, he meets Finn, who asks him to teach her three new words for her mom, then how to write as her mentor. He teaches her through example, making up a story on the spot, which she bought.

Invited to the O'Neils for dinner, Finn shows she has learned well the vocabulary Monte'd taught her. When Charlotte indirectly asks him about love, he basically says his wife was the love of his life.

Not only does the writer subtly influence people in town, but they help him find inspiration again. Finn spontaneously coming up with a story stimulates him to write a 
story for Flor, and then another.

One day in late August, Charlotte asks Monte to watch the girls while she finalizes her divorce in NYC. They bond, and he tells Finn how he ended up requiring a wheelchair, meeting the love of his life, and starting writing. Shortly thereafter he says his goodbyes.

Months pass and Monte has returned to Belle Isle. After selling the movie rights to his Western books,  he is able to buy the house next door, and the O'Neils welcome his return.

Cast
 Morgan Freeman as Monte Wildhorn
 Virginia Madsen as Charlotte O'Neil
 Emma Fuhrmann as Finnegan "Finn" O'Neil
 Madeline Carroll as Willow O'Neil
 Nicolette Pierini as Flora "Flor" O'Neil
 Kenan Thompson as Henry
 Kevin Pollak as Joe Viola
 Fred Willard as Al Kaiser
 Ash Christian as Carl Loop
 Jessica Hecht as Karen Loop
 Boyd Holbrook as Luke Ford

Production
The Magic of Belle Isle was filmed in the village of Greenwood Lake, New York in July 2011.

Reception
The Magic of Belle Isle received negative reviews from critics according to Rotten Tomatoes where the film has a rating of 29%, based on 34 reviews, with a rating of 4.9/10. On Metacritic, the film has a score of 46 out of 100, based on 14 critics, indicating "mixed or average reviews".

Home media
The film was released on DVD and Blu-ray on September 18, 2012.

References

External links

 
 

2012 films
Films directed by Rob Reiner
American drama films
2010s English-language films
Films about interracial romance
Films about writers
Voltage Pictures films
Castle Rock Entertainment films
Films scored by Marc Shaiman
Films about paraplegics or quadriplegics
2012 drama films
Films produced by David Valdes
2010s American films